Kyösti Tapani Karjalainen (born June 19, 1967) is a Finnish former professional ice hockey forward.  He was drafted by the Los Angeles Kings in the seventh round, 132nd overall, in the 1987 NHL Entry Draft. He played 28 regular-season and three playoff National Hockey League games with the Kings in the 1991–92 season.

Career statistics

References

External links

1967 births
Augsburger Panther players
Brynäs IF players
Djurgårdens IF Hockey players
Living people
Los Angeles Kings draft picks
Los Angeles Kings players
Luleå HF players
Modo Hockey players
People from Gävle
Phoenix Roadrunners (IHL) players
Södertälje SK players
Swedish ice hockey right wingers
Swedish expatriate ice hockey players in Germany
Swedish expatriate ice hockey players in the United States
Swedish people of Finnish descent
Tierps HK players
Timrå IK players
Sportspeople from Gävleborg County